Puning railway station is a railway station located in Puning City, Jieyang, Guangdong Province, China, on the Xiamen–Shenzhen Railway operated by Guangzhou Railway (Group) Corp., China Railway Corporation.

Railway stations in Guangdong